

The Wibault 360 was a 1930s French five-passenger airliner designed and built by the Wibault company.

Design and development
The Wibault 360 was a low-wing monoplane powered by a  Salmson 9Ab radial engine and equipped with conventional landing gear. The design was based on the earlier three-engined Wibault 283 but the 360 was smaller and had an enclosed cabin for a pilot and five passengers. The prototype, designated the 360T5, first flew in August 1931. A number of variants were built with different engines, the last of the series was the Wib.366 designed to compete in the 1934 London to Melbourne air race.

Variants
360T5
Prototype with a  Salmson 9Ab radial engine, one built.
362 
Variant powered by a  Gnome-Rhône 7Kb engine, two built in 1933.
365
Six-seat variant powered by a  Gnome-Rhône 9Kbrs radial engine, one built in 1933.
366
Variant for the MacRobertson Air Race powered by a  Hispano-Suiza 12Ybrs engine, it had a cruising speed of 250 km/h (155 mph), it did not take part in the race.
367
The Wibault 365 modified with a retractable landing gear.

Specifications (360 T.5)

References

Notes

Bibliography

1930s French airliners
Wib 360
Single-engined tractor aircraft
Low-wing aircraft
Aircraft first flown in 1931